Liang Yu may refer to:
 Liang Yu (footballer), Chinese footballer
 Liang Yu (activist), women’s rights advocate in China
 Yu Liang, Chinese military general and politician
 Liang Yu（baritone），Singer China JiangXi